Sebonack Golf Club is a private golf course in Southampton, New York, located on the Great Peconic Bay on Long Island. Opened in 2006, the course was designed by Jack Nicklaus and Tom Doak and is adjacent to the National Golf Links of America and Shinnecock Hills Golf Club.  The Clubhouse and guest cottages were designed by Hart Howerton.

When it opened, Sebonack was noted as one of the priciest private clubs, with membership starting at half a million dollars. It is owned by Michael Pascucci.

Sebonack was the host of the 2013 U.S. Women's Open, the first time the championship had been played on Long Island and the first in the greater New York City area since 1987.

References

External links

Nicklaus.com: Sebonack Golf Club
2013 U.S. Women's Open at USGA official site
2013 U.S. Women's Open at LPGA official site

Golf clubs and courses in New York (state)
Golf clubs and courses designed by Jack Nicklaus
Sports venues in Long Island
Sports venues in Suffolk County, New York
Southampton (town), New York
2006 establishments in New York (state)